Tiểu Cần is a township and capital of Tiểu Cần District, Trà Vinh Province, Vietnam.

References

Populated places in Trà Vinh province
District capitals in Vietnam
Townships in Vietnam